Zeydar (also Romanized as Zaidar and Zīdar) is a village in Qushkhaneh-ye Bala Rural District, Qushkhaneh District, Shirvan County, North Khorasan Province, Iran. At the 2006 census, its population was 727, in 152 families.

The local language is Turkmen.

References 

Populated places in Shirvan County